Raphael Loth (born 9 November 1996) is a Tanzanian football midfielder who plays for Young Africans.

References

1996 births
Living people
Tanzanian footballers
Tanzania international footballers
Mbeya City F.C. players
Young Africans S.C. players
Association football midfielders
Tanzanian Premier League players